Birendra Kishore Debbarma is an Indian politician from Tripura. He is a member of BJP. He won the election in 2018 as a  Member of Legislative Assembly (MLA) representing Golaghati
He is the candidate of the BJP to win a seat for the party in this assembly.

References

Tripura MLAs 2018–2023
Year of birth missing (living people)
Living people
Bharatiya Janata Party politicians from Tripura